Toshitsugu Nishihara (西原俊次, Nishihara Toshitsugu; born April 26, 1960) is a Japanese musician and composer, and the former keyboardist of Omega Tribe.

Biography 
Nishihara was hired as the keyboardist of the band Kyutipanchosu, composed of Kiyotaka Sugiyama, Shinji Takashima, and Akira Senju, after Senju left to be a solo musician. Before being hired, Kyutipanchosu was focused on rock, while Nishihara was focused on jazz. After being hired by producer Koichi Fujita, the band shifted its theme to an "urban sound with the scent of the sea" and was renamed to Kiyotaka Sugiyama & Omega Tribe. After the release of their debut single, "Summer Suspicion," the band had a successful career, with two of their singles, "Kimi no Heart wa Marine Blue" and "Futari no Natsu Monogatari" being their biggest hits. In 1985, the band disbanded due to differences between the band and the producers.

In 1986, Fujita brought vocalist Carlos Toshiki and guitarist Mitsuya Kurokawa to create 1986 Omega Tribe, along with Nishihara and Takashima. The debuted with the single "Kimi wa 1000%" and had another successful career. After Kurokawa left the band, the trio was renamed to Carlos Toshiki & Omega Tribe, where they hired backing singer Joey McCoy as a second vocalist. In 1990, the band split.

The following year, he formed DOME with Takashima and voice actor Satoshi Mikami, only being active in 1992. From 1994 to 1996, he was in Weather Side with Takashima and Hideaki Takatori. After, he was in charge of some of the songs in the NHK program "Nandemo Q" from 1995 to 2004, and acted as the bandmaster for Toshihiko Tahara from 1997 to 2008.

Discography

Kiyotaka Sugiyama and Omega Tribe 
"Saturday's Generation" (March 21, 1984)
"Rolling Memories" (May 29, 1985)
"Scramble Cross" (July 1, 1985)
"Kiri No Down Town" (December 11, 1985)

1986 Omega Tribe 
"Navigator" (July 23, 1986 / August 7, 1986)
"You Belong To Him" (July 23, 1986)
"Night Child" (July 23, 1986)
"Counterlight" (February 4, 1987)
"Indian Summer" (February 4, 1987)

Carlos Toshiki and Omega Tribe 
"Shitsuren Suru Tame no 500 no Manual" (February 8, 1989)
"1000 Love Songs" (February 8, 1989)
"Taiyō o Oikakete" (February 8, 1989)
"Kimi wa Yowakunai" (September 21, 1989)
"Kimi ni Aenai Getsuyōbi" (June 27, 1990)
"Lady of Mine" (unreleased)

DOME 
"Jiri Jiri Heaven"
"Ano Kaze o…"
"Kono Mama de Ite Hoshī"
"My Kitten"
"8 Tsuki no Koi"
"Hiroi Sekai no Naka de"

Weather Side 
"Still I Love You"
"Sunao ni Naritakute"
"Balance of Love"
"Ī no sa, Kimi no Mama"
"Sekai yo Futari no Tame ni Mawa re"
"Omuretsu"
"Happy Go Lucky"
"Ai ga Warau made"
"Umiheikō"
"Kono Mamaja Owarenai"

Masanori Ikeda 
"'Quarterback"

References 

Japanese musicians
1960 births
Japanese composers
Japanese keyboardists
Living people
Omega Tribe (Japanese band) members